Princess Wilhelmine Marie of Denmark and Norway (18 January 1808, Kiel, Duchy of Holstein – 30 May 1891 in Glücksburg, Schleswig-Holstein, Prussia, Germany) was a Princess of Denmark by birth, as daughter of King Frederick VI. She married her agnatic second cousin, the future King Frederick VII of Denmark, but the marriage ended in divorce.

Early life

Princess Wilhelmine Marie was born the daughter of Crown Prince Frederick by his wife and first cousin Princess Marie Sophie of Hesse-Kassel. Her father Frederick was the only son of King Christian VII of Denmark. He had been appointed regent at the age of 16 in 1784 because his father, King Christian VII, had major psychological problems and was mentally incapable of functioning as king. Within two months of Wilhelmine Marie's birth, her grandfather died of a cerebral aneurysm and her father became king. At the time of her death, she was the last surviving grandchild of Christian VII.

First marriage

Since her father had no surviving legitimate sons, Wilhelmine Marie was a very desirable bride. Among her suitors was the future Oscar I of Sweden of the then newly established Bernadotte dynasty. On 1 November 1828 in Copenhagen, she married Prince Frederick of Denmark, the future King Frederick VII. The engagement had been made official in 1826. Prince Frederick was a direct male-line descendant of King Frederick V by his second Queen Juliana Maria of Brunswick-Wolfenbüttel. The marriage united the two lines of the Royal House, which had been in a strained relationship since 1814, and was very popular: the public celebrations were unusually vivid, with illuminations, poems, public festivities and a foundation, Vilhelmine-Stiftelsen, for the benefit of providing brides with a suitable equipment. The marriage soon turned out to be an unhappy one. That was not least because of Frederick's debauched lifestyle with infidelity and heavy drinking. It was said that Wilhelmine, although good hearted and mild, lacked character and was unable to gain any influence on Frederick, and that Frederick deeply hurt her "female feelings". Her unhappy marriage was also a cause of concern for her parents, who felt sorry for her. The couple were separated in 1834, and divorced in 1837.

Second marriage

In Amalienborg Palace on 19 May 1838 she married second Karl, Duke of Schleswig-Holstein-Sonderburg-Glücksburg, eldest brother of the future King Christian IX of Denmark, and took residence in Kiel. Her second marriage was said to have been very happy. Both her marriages were childless. Many believe that she was barren as there are no records of her having any miscarriages or stillbirths.

During the First Schleswig War (1848–1851), her spouse actively sided against Denmark. That caused Wilhelmine's relations with the Danish Royal family to be severed for some time. During the war, she resided in Dresden. In 1852 there was a reconciliation and she again enjoyed a close relationship with her family in Copenhagen, returning to Denmark with Karl, often living at Louisenlund Castle. Her status as the daughter of a well-loved King helped her to regain her popularity among the Danish people. Her consort never did. In 1870, she took residence in Glücksburg Castle, where she lived the rest of her life. Karl died in 1878. Wilhelmine spent her old age isolated, as she had difficulty communicating in social life after she lost her hearing, but she spent a lot of time on charity and became popular in Glücksburg because of this. She was reportedly sorry for Denmark's loss of the duchies in 1864 and happy over the new royal dynasty in Denmark.

Ancestry

References

Citations

Bibliography

External links

 Princess Vilhelmine at the website of the Royal Danish Collection at Rosenborg Castle
 Profile (in Danish)

1808 births
1891 deaths
Danish princesses
Norwegian princesses
Vilhelmine Marie
Children of Frederick VI of Denmark
Frederick VII of Denmark
Daughters of kings